The name Metropolitan Hotel may refer to:
Metropolitan Hotel (Asbury Park) a New Jersey hotel that closed in 1989.
Metropolitan Hotel (New York City), a Manhattan hotel that closed in 1895.
Metropolitan Hotel, Sydney, a heritage-listed hotel in Sydney New South Wales, Australia
The Metropolitan Hotel, an album by Chely Wright